Lophocampa pectina is a moth of the family Erebidae. It was described by William Schaus in 1896. It is found in Mexico.

Description
Antenna very deeply pectinated in the (male). Head and thorax dark buff; two black points on the collar and two on each patagia. Body chrome yellow. Primaries yellow with a broad basal and median transverse grayish shade; a double terminal and subterminal fine dark wavy line, the space within filled with a darker shade; the fringe yellowish with some black spots. Secondaries yellow. Expanse, M 41 mm.

References

 
Lophocampa pectina at BOLD Systems

pectina
Moths described in 1896